Lynette Long is an American former university professor who has published more than thirty books and dozens of articles in trade and professional journals. A math education expert, she is particularly interested in the math achievement of young girls. Long coined the phrase "latchkey children" with her husband Thomas Long and wrote the bestselling "Handbook for Latchkey Children and Their Working Parents."  She is president and Founder of the not-for-profit: Equal Visibility Everywhere. During the 2016 Democratic Presidential Primary, Long served as the Volunteer Florida State Organizer for Hillary Clinton. She was an at-large Delegate to the Democratic National Convention. Long is an American feminist and contributor to the feminist movement in the United States.

Education 
Long graduated in 1969 from the University of Illinois with a Bachelor of Science in Zoology and Chemistry.  Subsequent to her undergraduate studies, Lynette went on to acquire a master's degree in Mathematics and PhD in educational and counseling psychology.

Equal Visibility Everywhere 
Long is the founder and president of Equal Visibility Everywhere (EVE), a not-for-profit which focuses on researching the under-representation of women on our nation's symbols and icons: currency, stamps, statues, Google Doodles, monuments and memorials, street names, and national holidays. Long was the first person to bring national attention to the fact that there was not a single woman represented on our nation's paper currency.  As a result of her ground-breaking work and the efforts of other feminist groups, the Treasury Department will feature women on United States paper currency. Her research has brought national attention to the fact that only nine of the one hundred statues in National Statuary Hall in the United States Capitol honor women. Long has been instrumental in securing authorization for a statue of Amelia Earhart in the United States Capitol. Long has focused awareness around the country on the general lack of female statuary which has led to an increase in the number of statues of women commissioned. Long is also spearheading an effort to increase the number of Florida State Historical Markers honoring women.  At the time of her initial research in 2017, only six of the 950 markers in the State of Florida specifically honored women. Since 2017, Long has successfully applied for and found funding for numerous Florida State Historical Markers honoring women including, Miami Beach Preservationist Barbara Baer Capitman, Author Marjorie Kinnan Rawlings, Aviatrix Amelia Earhart, Doctor Eleanor Galt Simmons, and Seminole Chief Betty Mae Tiger Jumper. Long is a frequent public speaker often discussing her research on the lack of symbolic representation of women and its psychological impact on women and girls.

Latchkey children 
Long is responsible for coining the term latchkey kid and bringing to national attention the hidden plight of latchkey children. A former elementary and middle school principal, Long noticed her students wearing house keys on chains around their necks.  She interviewed these students and found that they were often lonely or afraid during the two or three hours they spent home alone after school.  These initial conversations led to exhaustive research, hundreds of interviews with latchkey children, their parents, and former latchkey children. The culmination of her work was published in The Handbook for Latchkey Children and Their Working Parents (with Thomas J. Long) and on my Own: The Kids Self-Care Book as well as in dozens of articles. Long's research has been reported by every major news outlet and in hundreds of magazine and newspaper articles.

Media personality 
Long has appeared on hundreds of radio and television programs as a child development expert including, The Today Show, Good Morning America, The Phil Donahue Show, Geraldo, and The Merv Griffin Show.  She was selected as the national spokesperson for Thomas J. Lipton and Company and Pets are Wonderful. Long was the host of ONE ON ONE WITH DR. LYNETTE LONG a call-in radio program in Okinawa, Japan.  The program was hosted by the Armed Forces Network and was aimed at helping U.S. Service Members discuss problems related to the stress of overseas service.

Professor 
Long was a college professor at the Loyola University in Baltimore, American University in Washington, DC and at the University of Maryland – University College. Long has taught over thirty different courses in the areas of psychology, education and mathematics.

U.S. politics 
Long has written numerous editorials on American politics published in newspapers around the country. Long was very active in the 2008 and 2016 Hillary Clinton Campaigns for the Presidency.  In 2008 Long was an active blogger for Hillary and wrote a definitive piece on the impact of the caucuses on the outcome of the primary.  In 2016 Long was the HRC Super Volunteers Florida State Captain.  She worked in grassroots organizing everywhere from Panama City to Key West.  A member of the Hillary for America Florida Leadership Committee for the 2016 Presidential Campaign, Long also was elected as an at-large delegate for the State of Florida to the 2016 Democratic National Convention.

Publications

Books 
 Long, L., Painless Algebra, (5th Edition), Kaplan Publishers, 2020
 Long, L., Fractions Diagnostic Test, Fill in the Gaps Publishers, 2020
 Long, L., Painless Geometry, (3rd Edition), Barron's Publishers, Hauppauge, NY, 2018
 Long, L., Painless Algebra, (4th Edition), Barron's Publishers, Hauppauge, NY, 2016
 Long, L., Painless Algebra, (3rd Edition), Barron's Publishers, Hauppauge, NY, 2011
 Long, L., Painless Geometry, (2nd Edition), Barron's Publishers, Hauppauge, NY, 2009
 Long, L., Painless Algebra, (2nd Edition), Barron's Publishers, New York City, 2006
 Long, L., Algebra Sin Dolor: Painless Algebra, Spanish Edition, Barron's Publishers, Hauppauge NY, 2005
 Long, L., Math Smarts, Tips, Tricks, and Secrets for Making Math More Fun! American Girl Library, Middleton, WI, 2004
 Long, L., Wacky Word Problems, Games and Activities That Make Math Easy and Fun! John Wiley and Sons, New York, 2005
 Long, L., Great Graphing and Sensational Statistics, Games and Activities That Make Math Easy and Fun! John Wiley and Sons, New York, 2004
 Long, L., Delightful Decimals and Perfect Percents, Games and Activities That Make Math Easy and Fun, John Wiley and Sons, New York, 2002
 Long, L., Groovy Geometry, Games and Activities That Make Math Easy and Fun! John Wiley and Sons, New York, 2003
 Long, L., Measurement Mania, Games and Activities That Make Math Easy and Fun! John Wiley and Sons, New York, 2001
 Long, L., Fabulous Fractions, Games and Activities That Make Math Easy and Fun! John Wiley and Sons, New York, 2001
 Long, L., Dazzling Division, Games and Activities That Make Math Easy and Fun! John Wiley and Sons, New York, 2000
 Long, L., Marvelous Multiplication, Games and Activities That Make Math Easy and  Fun! John Wiley and Sons, New York, 2000
 Long, L., Painless Geometry, Barron's Publishers, Hauppauge, NY, 2001
 Long, L., Painless Algebra, Barron's Publishers, Hauppauge, NY, 1998
 Long, L., One Dollar: My First Book About Money, Barron's Publishers, Hauppauge, NY, 1998
 Long, L., Domino, 1,2,3, Franklin Watts Ltd, London, England, 1998
 Long, L., Dealing with Addition, Charlesbridge Publishers, Boston, MA, 1998
 Long, L. and Teresa Mlawer, Sumemos Con El Domino, Spanish Edition, Charlesbridge Publishers, Boston, MA, 1997
 Long, L., Domino Addition, Charlesbridge Publishers, Boston, MA, 1996
 Long, L. & Hershberger, E., One Year to a College Degree, Huntington House Publishers, Louisiana, 1992
 Long, L., Understanding/Responding: A Communication Manual for Nurses, Jones and Bartlett Publishers, Boston, 1992
 Long, L., On My Own: The Kids Guide to Self-Care, Acropolis Publishers, Washington, DC., 1984
 Long, L. & Long, T., The Handbook for Latchkey Children and Their Parents, Arbor House, New York, 1983
 Long, L. & Prophit, P., Understanding/ Responding: Human Relations Development for Nurses, Wadsworth, Monterey, CA, 1981
 Long, L., Listening-Responding: Human Relations Training for Teachers, Brooks/Cole Publishers, CA, 1978

Book chapters 
 Long, L. & Ihle, E. Philosophy of Education.  In Sadker, M. and Sadker, D., Teachers, Schools and Society, New York, Random House, 1988
 Sadker, M., Sadker, D. and Long, L., Gender and Educational Equity. In Banks, J. and Banks, C., Multicultural Education, New York, Allyn & Bacon, 1988
 Long, L. and Long T. Childhood Full Circle, In Young America, Heritage Plantation, 1985
 Long, T. And Long, L., Latchkey Children.  In Katz, L., Current Topics in Early Childhood Education, Volume V, Ablex Publishing Company, Norwood, New Jersey, 1983
 Long, L. Human Relations Training: Goals and Strategies. Reprinted in Dustin, R., Foxley, C and Colangelo, N., Multicultural Non-Sexist Education: A Human Relations Approach, Kendall/Hunt Publishers, Dubuque, Iowa, 1982
 Long, L. It Just Wasn't What I Thought. In Watrin, Rita, A Personalized Approach to Individualized Instruction, New York, Ferris Publishing Company, 1979
 Long, T. J. and Long, L.  TA and Client Centered Therapy, In James, M. Techniques in TA for Psychotherapists and Counselors, Reading, Massachusetts, Addison-Wesley Publishing Company, 1977, 183–197

Media 
 Long, L., Safe at Home, (Filmstrip and resource material), Arena Productions, A Division of Encyclopædia Britannica, Chicago, Illinois, 1986
 Long, L., Know Your Neighborhood, (Filmstrip and resource material), Arena Productions, A Division of Encyclopædia Britannica, Chicago, Illinois, 1986
 Long, L., Watching Younger Siblings, (Filmstrip and resource material), Arena Productions, A Division of Encyclopædia Britannica, Chicago, Illinois, 1986

Plays 
Long's plays focus on themes relevant to women issues and feminism.
 Long, L. One in Two: We Won the Right to Choose But Not the Right to Grieve, produced at the Capital Fringe Festival in Washington, DC as well as several readings in New York and New Jersey.
 Long, L. Sensational Surrogates, Winner 2nd Place, 30th Annual National One-Act Playwriting Contest, Dubuque, Iowa. Sensational Surrogates was produced at St. Joseph's Theatre, Dubuque, Iowa.
 Long, L. Stuck:  A Day in the Life of a Therapist, Workshop in New York City.

Museum Curator 

Lynette Long curated museum exhibits in partnership with the Miami Design Preservation League and Miami Beach Pride.  The exhibits included the annual "Legacy Couple’s Exhibit" (2022),the "Women Who Made a Difference" (2020) and "Unfinished Business" (2020) commemorating the 100th Anniversary of Women's Suffrage in the United States.

References

21st-century American psychologists
American women psychologists
20th-century American mathematicians
Women mathematicians
1948 births
Living people
21st-century American mathematicians
University of Illinois alumni
Mathematicians from New York (state)
20th-century American women
21st-century American women
20th-century American psychologists